Alex Scarrow (born 14 February 1966) is a British author most known for his young adult science fiction series TimeRiders.

Early life

Alex Scarrow used to be a rock guitarist in a band, spending ten years after college in the music business.  He eventually figured that he would never become famous nor get a record deal. He left the music industry in order to become a graphic artist and then he decided to be a computer games designer. He worked on game titles such as Waterworld, Evolva, The Thing, Spartan, Gates of Troy, Legion Arena, and Ultimate Soccer Manager.

He started his writing career initially by writing screenplays, but after difficulty entering the business he turned his strongest screenplay into the successful A Thousand Suns novel. He has since written a number of successful novels, including October Skies. He has also written several screenplays, and is currently writing a highly successful young adult fiction series, which, according to his TimeRiders website, "Allowed him to really have fun with the ideas and concepts he was playing around with when designing games."

He currently lives in Norwich with his son, Jacob and his partner, Debbie, and two rats.

Books

Thrillers
A Thousand Suns – 3 May 2006
Last Light – 25 July 2007
October Skies – 21 August 2008
Afterlight – 27 May 2010
The Candle Man – 26 April 2012

TimeRiders
Alex Scarrow wrote the TimeRiders series over 9 books in total. The series is about an agency which consists of three teenagers who have cheated death, and who travel in time to fix history broken by time travel.
TimeRiders – 4 February 2010
TimeRiders: Day of the Predator – 12 October 2010
TimeRiders: The Doomsday Code – 3 February 2011
TimeRiders: The Eternal War – 14 July 2011
TimeRiders: Gates of Rome – 2 February 2012
TimeRiders: City of Shadows – 2 August 2012
TimeRiders: The Pirate Kings – 7 February 2013
TimeRiders: The Mayan Prophecy – 18 July 2013
TimeRiders: The Infinity Cage – 6 November 2014

Ellie Quin
Ellie Quin is a new series about a young girl who thought she was ordinary.  It turns out she couldn't have been more wrong.  She's the most valuable, the most dangerous, the most sought-after human in the universe... and there are people already zeroing in on her.

Ellie Quin Book 1: The Legend of Ellie Quin – 23 December 2013
Ellie Quin Book 2: The World According to Ellie Quin – 23 December 2013
Ellie Quin Book 3: Beneath the Neon Sky – 23 December 2013
Ellie Quin Book 4: Ellie Quin in Wonderland – 1 January 2014 (ASIN: B00I9P2Q3W)

Other 

 Remade (Remade 1) - 16 June 2016
 Reborn (Remade Trilogy 2) - 29 June 2017
 Plague World (A Remade Novel) - 26 July 2018
 Plague Nation (A Remade Novel) - 26 July 2018
 Plague Land (A Remade Novel) - 26 July 2018

References

External links

  (Scarrow brothers Alex and Simon)
 
 

1966 births
Living people
English children's writers
British alternative history writers
British writers of young adult literature
Writers from Norwich
English male novelists
21st-century English novelists
21st-century English male writers